Johann Heinrich Hoffmann (1669 in /Thüringen; April 6, 1716 in Berlin) was a German  astronomer.

Life and work
Hoffmann was a student of Erhard Weigel and, until his death in 1699, his  (assistant). He accompanied  him on his journey of 1696 - 1697 to Denmark and Sweden. From February 1701 Hoffmann was employed first as Adjunkt and later as astronomer and observator at the Königlich Preußischen Sozietät der Wissenschaften in Berlin. At the Berlin Observatory he began his duties as assistant of the first director Gottfried Kirch and after the latter's death in 1710, he succeeded him as director and continued the main task of calculating the calendar, up till his own death.

Apart from his activities as director of the Berlin Observatory, from 1705 he led at the same time the private observatory of Bernhard Friedrich von Krosigk and was from 1710 until at least 1712 also a teacher to the Cadet Corps.

References 

17th-century German astronomers
1669 births
1716 deaths
Scientists from Thuringia
18th-century German astronomers